Fadzil Mahmood (1937 – 9 June 2010) was a Malaysian politician who served as the Speaker of the Perlis State Assembly from  9 September 1986 until 4 October 1990 during the administration of Abdul Hamid Pawanteh as Menteri Besar of Perlis. He represented Utan Aji in the assembly.  Fadzil also served as a state executive councillor from 1990 to 1995.

Fadzil's wife, Datin Fatimah Ismail, died on 6 May 2010, at the age of 71. He was soon after admitted to Tuanku Fauziah Hospital for a heart ailment on 2 June 2010. Fadzil returned home from the hospital on 8 June. He died at his home in Kampung Surau, Utan Aji, Kangar, Perlis, Malaysia, at 3:30 a.m. on 9 June 2010, at the age of 73.

Fadzil was survived by two daughters, Faniza and Fazlin; two sons, Faiz and Faisal; and five grandchildren.

References

1937 births
2010 deaths
People from Perlis
Malaysian people of Malay descent
Malaysian Muslims
United Malays National Organisation politicians
Members of the Dewan Negara
Speakers of the Perlis State Legislative Assembly